is a passenger railway station in located in the city of Kinokawa, Wakayama Prefecture, Japan, operated by West Japan Railway Company (JR West).

Lines
Nate Station is served by the Wakayama Line, and is located 63.2 kilometers from the terminus of the line at Ōji Station.

Station layout
The station consists of two opposed side platforms connected to the station building by a footbridge. The station is unattended.

Platforms

Adjacent stations

|-

History
Nate Station opened on October 1, 1901 on the Kiwa Railway after considerable dispute between local residents on its location. The line was sold to the Kansai Railway in 1904, which was subsequently nationalized in 1907. With the privatization of the Japan National Railways (JNR) on April 1, 1987, the station came under the aegis of the West Japan Railway Company.

Passenger statistics
In fiscal 2019, the station was used by an average of 438 passengers daily (boarding passengers only).

Surrounding Area
Kinokawa City Hall Naka Branch (formerly Naka Town Hall)
Hanaoka Seishu Memorial Park
Former Nate-juku Honjin
Iimoriyama Castle Ruins
Kinokawa Municipal Master Elementary School

See also
List of railway stations in Japan

References

External links

 Nate Station Official Site

Railway stations in Wakayama Prefecture
Railway stations in Japan opened in 1901
Kinokawa, Wakayama